Lot 58 is a township in Queens County, Prince Edward Island, Canada.  It is part of St. John's Parish. Lot 58 was awarded to Joshua Mauger in the 1767 land lottery. It passed to Alexander Anderson after 1775, to Alexander Ellice by 1798, and to the Earl of Selkirk by 1803.

Villages
Belfast

Unincorporated communities
Fodhla 	
Garfield 	
Glasbhein 	
North Pinette 	
Ocean View 	
Pinette 	
Pinette North 	
Pinette South 	
Surrey 
Township 58 	
Valley

References

58
Geography of Queens County, Prince Edward Island